Bruno Henrique Corsini, simply known as Bruno Henrique (born 21 October 1989), is a Brazilian professional footballer who plays as a central midfielder for Saudi Professional League club Al-Ittihad.

Career
After a four-year period with Iraty, Bruno Henrique signed with Londrina.

In January 2012, Bruno Henrique signed with Londrina, and made 44 appearances for the side in Paraná State League, also appearing once with the club in Série D.

On 12 July 2013, Bruno Henrique signed a six-month deal with Portuguesa. On the 21st he made his Série A debut, starting in a 1–2 away loss against Goiás. His first top flight goal came on 1 August, in a 1–1 home draw against Criciúma.

Career statistics

Honours

Corinthians
Campeonato Brasileiro Série A: 2015

Palmeiras
Campeonato Brasileiro Série A: 2018

Al-Ittihad
Saudi Super Cup: 2022

Individual
Bola de Prata: 2018
Campeonato Brasileiro Série A Team of the Year: 2018

References

External links
 Bruno Henrique at Enciclopédia Galo Digital 

Bruno Henrique at playmakerstats.com (English version of ogol.com.br)

1989 births
Living people
Association football midfielders
Brazilian footballers
Brazilian expatriate footballers
Brazilian people of Italian descent
Campeonato Brasileiro Série A players
Clube Atlético Mineiro players
Londrina Esporte Clube players
Associação Portuguesa de Desportos players
Sport Club Corinthians Paulista players
Palermo F.C. players
Sociedade Esportiva Palmeiras players
Ittihad FC players
Serie A players
Saudi Professional League players
Expatriate footballers in Saudi Arabia
Brazilian expatriate sportspeople in Saudi Arabia